The  is a 10-metre long, 3-metre wide, arched,  bridge near the mouth of the Sakita River in Miyakojima, Okinawa Prefecture, Japan. It is the only bridge of its kind on the island of Miyakojima and was designated a Prefectural Historic Site in July 1977. It is one of the extra 20 bridges of "100 Noted Bridges in Japan".

History
The Ikeda bridge is said to have been built in the era of the Zhengde Emperor around 1506-1521 together with another bridge, Shimojiba Suuntu, which was later swept away. The first documentary evidence for the bridge is the 1727 , the era of the Yongzheng Emperor. The bridge was repaired in 1817.

See also
 Megane Bridge
 Sakishima Beacons
 List of Historic Sites of Japan (Okinawa)

References

Bridges in Japan
Stone bridges in Japan
Buildings and structures in Okinawa Prefecture